Hans D. Sluga (born April 24, 1937) is a German philosopher who spent most of his career as professor of philosophy at the University of California, Berkeley. Sluga teaches and writes on topics in the history of analytic philosophy, the history of continental philosophy, as well as on political theory, and ancient philosophy in Greece and China.  He has been particularly influenced by the thought of Gottlob Frege, Ludwig Wittgenstein, Martin Heidegger, Friedrich Nietzsche, and Michel Foucault.

Education and career
Hans Sluga studied at the University of Bonn and the University of Munich. He subsequently obtained a BPhil at Oxford, where he studied under R. M. Hare, Isaiah Berlin, Gilbert Ryle and Michael Dummett.

Since 1970, Sluga has been a professor of philosophy at the University of California, Berkeley, serving from 2009 as the William and Trudy Ausfahl Professor of Philosophy until his retirement in 2020. He previously served as a lecturer in philosophy at University College London.

Philosophical work

Sluga describes his philosophical orientation as follows: "My overall philosophical outlook is radically historicist. I believe that we can understand ourselves only as beings with a particular evolution and history."

He has worked extensively on the early history of analytic philosophy. In his writings on Gottlob Frege he has sought to establish the influence of Immanuel Kant, Hermann Lotze, and of Neo-Kantians like Cuno Fischer and Wilhelm Windelband on Frege's views on the foundations of mathematics and in the theory of meaning. This historically oriented approach to Frege's thought brought him into sharp conflict with Michael Dummett's "realist" interpretation of Frege. Sluga's work in analytic philosophy has been influenced substantially by Wittgenstein to whose early and late writings he has devoted a number of studies. His writings on both Frege and Wittgenstein have contributed to the development of the study of the history of analytic philosophy as a field within analytic philosophy.

Since the early 1990s Sluga has become increasingly concerned with political philosophy. In Heidegger's Crisis he set out to explore the question why philosophers from Plato till the present get so often entangled in dangerous political affairs. Sluga analyzes Heidegger's political engagement by putting it into the larger context of the development of German philosophy in the Nazi period. He seeks to show thereby that many diagnoses of Heidegger's politics are misdirected because of their overly narrow focus on the person and work of Heidegger. He challenges, in particular, the claim that Heidegger's critique of reason is to blame for his political errors by pointing out that committed "rationalists" among the German philosophers were prone to the same errors. Sluga's book seeks to show that the willingness to involve themselves politically not only Heidegger, but also of Neo-Kantians like Bruno Bauch, Neo-Fichteans like Max Wundt, and Nietzscheans like Alfred Baeumler was ultimately due to their misconceived belief that they were living through a moment of world-historical crisis in which they were particularly called upon to intervene.

His book Politics and the Search for the Common Good seeks to re-think politics in substantially new terms. Sluga distinguishes in it between a long tradition of "normative political theorizing" that ranges from Plato and Aristotle through Kant to contemporary writers like John Rawls and a more recent form of "diagnostic practice" that emerged in the 19th century and whose first practitioners were Karl Marx and Friedrich Nietzsche. Diagnostic political philosophy, Sluga argues, does not seek to establish political norms through a process of abstract philosophical reasoning but seeks to reach practical conclusions through a careful diagnosis of the political realities. Identifying himself with this strand of political philosophizing, Sluga proceeds to examine the thinking of Carl Schmitt, Hannah Arendt, and Michel Foucault as 20th century exemplars of the diagnostic approach. The book seeks to highlight the promise and the achievements of the diagnostic method as well as its shortcomings so far and its inherent limitations. In doing so, Sluga maps out an understanding of politics that makes use of some of Wittgenstein's methodological concepts. He characterizes politics as a family resemblance phenomenon and argues that the concept of politics does not identify a natural kind. It is therefore also mistaken to assume that there is a single common good at which all politics aims. Similarly, we must forgo the belief that there is a best form of government (as, e.g., democracy). Politics must, rather, be conceived as a continuous search for a common good which can have no final, conclusive answer. It is a sphere of uncertainty in which we operate always with a radically incomplete and unreliable picture of where we are and with only shifting ideas of where we want to go. The institutional forms that this search takes will change over time. Sluga agrees with other diagnostic thinkers that the classical institution of the modern state is now giving way to a new form of political order which he calls "the corporāte," whose challenges are defined by the growth of human populations, rapid technological changes, and an ever more pressing environmental crisis.

Wittgenstein
Sluga is a noted interpreter of Wittgenstein and has contributed significantly to Wittgenstein scholarship, including editing the 1996 volume The Cambridge Companion to Wittgenstein with David G. Stern. He has argued against the relevance of increasingly more detailed and sophisticated analyses of Wittgenstein's work, even claiming that Wittgenstein himself would not have regarded this exegetical excess as a legitimate concern for philosophy. In recent years, he has endorsed Rubert Read's "post-therapeutic" or "liberatory" interpretation of Wittgenstein.

Books
Gottlob Frege, Routledge & Kegan Paul, London 1980 
Chinese translation, Beijing 1990, 2nd ed. 1993
Greek translation, Athens 2010
Heidegger's Crisis.  Philosophy and Politics in Nazi Germany, Harvard U. P. 1993
Chinese translation, Beijing 2015
Wittgenstein, Wiley-Blackwell, 2011
Italian translation, 2012
Arabic translation, 2014
Chinese translation, 2015
Politics and the Search for the Common Good, Cambridge U. P. 2014
The Philosophy of Frege, (ed.), 4 vols., Garland Press, 1993
The Cambridge Companion to Wittgenstein, (ed. With David Stern), Cambridge U. P. 1996 
Licensed Chinese edition, Beijing 2007

Articles 
 "Frege and the Rise of Analytic Philosophy", Inquiry, vol. 18, 1975
 "Frege as a  Rationalist," in Studies on Frege, ed. M. Schirn, Stuttgart 1976, vol. 1
 "Frege's Alleged Realism," Inquiry, vol. 20, 1977
 "Subjectivity in the Tractatus", Synthese, vol. 56, 1983
 "Frege: The Early Years", in Philosophy in History, ed. Q. Skinner et al., Cambridge U. P. 1984
 "Foucault, the author and the discourse", Inquiry, vol. 28, 1985
 "Frege against the Booleans", Notre Dame Journal of Formal Logic, 1987
 "Semantic Content and Cognitive Sense", in Frege Synthesized, Amsterdam 1987.
 "Das Ich muss aufgegeben werden. Zur Metaphysik in der analytischen Philosophie", in Metaphysik nach Kant?, Stuttgart 1987
 "Heidegger: suite sans fin," in Le Messager Europeen, vol. 3, 1989  
 "Macht und Ohnmacht der analytischen Philosophie",  in Bausteine wissenschaftlicher Weltauffassung, ed. F. Stadtler, Vienna 1996
 “Frege on Meaning", Ratio, vol. 9, 1996
 "'Whose house is that?' Wittgenstein on the self", in The Cambridge Companion to Wittgenstein, 1996
 "Homelessness and Homecoming. Nietzsche, Heidegger, Hölderlin,"  in India and Beyond, Amsterdam 1996
 "What has history to do with me? Wittgenstein and analytic philosophy", Inquiry, March 1998
 "Von der Uneinheitlichkeit des Wissens", in Philosophie in synthetischer Absicht, ed. by M. Stamm, Stuttgart 1998
 "Truth before Tarski" in Alfred Tarski and the Vienna Circle, Kluwer, Dordrecht 1999
 "Heidegger and the Critique of Reason", in What's Left of Enlightenment?, ed. K. Baker and P. H. Reill, Stanford 2001
 "Conflict is the Father of Everything: Heidegger’s Polemical Conception of Politics" in Heidegger’s Introduction to Metaphysics, ed. R. Polt and G. Fried, Yale U.P., New Haven 2001
 "Frege and the Indefinability of Truth" in From Frege to Wittgenstein, ed. E. Reck, Oxford 2001
 "Freges These von der Undefinierbarkeit der Wahrheit" in Das Wahre und das Falsche. Studien zu Freges Auffassung der Wahrheit, ed. by Dirk GreimannOlms 2003
 "Wittgenstein and Pyrrhonism," in Pyrrhonian Skepticism, edited by Walter Sinnott-Arnstrong, Oxford U. P. 2004 
 "Heidegger’s Nietzsche," in The Blackwell Companion to Heidegger, ed. by Mark Wrathall and Hubert Dreyfus, Blackwell Publishing, 2005
 "Foucault’s Encounter with Heidegger and Nietzsche," in The Cambridge Companion to Foucault, 2nd ed., ed. by Gary Gutting, Cambridge U. P., 2005
 "Der erkenntnistheoretische Anarchismus. Paul Feyerabend in Berkeley," in Paul Feyerabend. Ein Philosoph aus Wien, edited by Kurt Fischer and Friedrich Stadler, Vienna 2005.
 "Stanley Cavell and the Care of the Common", in The Claim of Community. Essays on Stanley Cavell and Political Philosophy, edited by Andrew Norris, Stanford U. P. 2006
 "Family Resemblance", in Deepening our Understanding of Wittgenstein, edited by Michael Kober, Rodopi, Amsterdam 2006
 "Glitter and Doom at the Metropolitan: German Art in Search of the Self," Inquiry, vol. 50, 2007
 "Truth and the Imperfection of Language," in Essays on Frege's Conception of Truth. Grazer Philosophische Studien, ed. By Dirk Greimann, vol. 75, 2007
 "The Pluralism of the Political. From Schmitt to Arendt," Telos, vol. 142, 2008, (28 pp.)
 "I am only a Nietzschean," in Foucault and Philosophy, ed. by Timothy O’Leary and Christopher Falzon, Wiley-Blackwell, Chichester 2010
 "Our grammar lacks surveyability," in Language and World. Part One. Essays on the Philosophy of Wittgenstein, edited by Volker Munz, Klaus Puhl, and Joseph Wang, ontos verlag, Frankfurt 2010
 "'Could you define the sense you give the word "political"'? Michel Foucault as a Political Philosopher," History of the Human Sciences, vol. 24, 2011
 "Von der normativen Theorie zu diagnostischen Praxis" Deutsche Zeitschrift für Philosophie, vol. 59, 2011
 "Simple Objects: Complex Questions," in Wittgenstein’s Early Philosophy, edited by José L. Zalabardo, Oxford U. P., Oxford 2012
 "Beyond 'the New' Wittgenstein," in Ethics, Society, Politics, Proceedings of the 35th International Ludwig Wittgenstein Symposium, edited by Hajo Greif and Martin Gerhard Weiss, De Gruyter Ontos, Berlin/Boston 2013
 "Der Mensch ist von Natur aus ein politisches Lebewesen. Zur Kritik der politischen Anthropologie," in Die Anthropologische Wende'', Schwabe Verlag, Basel 2014

References

1939 births
Living people
Alumni of the University of Oxford
University of California, Berkeley faculty
Analytic philosophers
German logicians
21st-century German philosophers
Philosophers of mathematics
German male writers